Marko Hhawu (born 3 September 1978) is a Tanzanian long-distance runner. He competed in the men's 10,000 metres at the 1996 Summer Olympics.

References

1978 births
Living people
Athletes (track and field) at the 1996 Summer Olympics
Tanzanian male long-distance runners
Olympic athletes of Tanzania
Place of birth missing (living people)